Nyando may refer to:
The Nyando River in Kenya
The former Nyando District, named after the river
The New York and Ottawa Railroad (NY and O)
Nyando, New York, named after the railroad, and now known as Rooseveltown